U.S. Highway 218 (US 218) is an original United States Highway that was created in 1926. Although technically a spur of US 18, US 218 neither begins nor ends at US 18, but overlaps US 18 for  near Charles City, Iowa. A large portion of US 218 in Iowa is part of the Avenue of the Saints, which connects St. Louis, Missouri, and Saint Paul, Minnesota.

Route description

Iowa

US 218 begins in downtown Keokuk at an intersection with US 136 and US 61 Business (US 61 Bus.) at Main and 7th streets. The highway heads north along Main Street with US 61 Bus. As they exit Keokuk, the business route ends at an intersection with the mainline US 61, which bypasses the city. US 218 and US 61 head north concurrently for a few miles before US 218 exits to the northwest; US 61 follows the Mississippi River north towards Fort Madison. US 218 travels northwesterly for almost  along a two-lane road. As it approaches Donnellson, it meets up with and joins Iowa Highway 27 (Iowa 27), the Avenue of the Saints.

The two highways head north on a four-lane expressway. In Donnellson, they meet Iowa 2 at a diamond interchange. Further north, and east of Houghton, they intersect Iowa 16 at an at-grade intersection. Prior to crossing the Skunk River, the roadway angles to the northeast and a freeway bypass of Mount Pleasant begins. From the east, the highways are joined by US 34 and Iowa 163. The four highways loop around the city's eastern side and begin traversing the northern side when US 34 and Iowa 163 split away to continue bypassing Mount Pleasant; US 218 and Iowa 27 continue north.

Minnesota
US 218 enters the state at Lyle, in Mower County. It follows along the east side of the Iowa, Chicago, and Eastern Railroad line as it continues northward through farm fields. Southeast of Austin, US 218 angles northeastward to bypass the city, its former route following County Road 45 (CR 45) into town.

US 218 passes by the Austin Municipal Airport just before its interchange with I-90. The highway runs concurrently with I-90 for nearly  through northern Austin. When US 218 departs from the Interstate and turns back north, it becomes a four-lane divided highway for a short distance. After its junction with State Highway 251 (MN 251), the highway angles north-northwestward again following the IC&E rail line, this time on the west side of the tracks.

The highway enters Dodge County for less than a mile, then reaches Steele County, Blooming Prairie, and an eight-block-long concurrency with MN 30. It continues north-northwesterly after leaving Blooming Prairie, traveling through predominantly agricultural scenery. It passes by Oak Glen Lake before going through the unincorporated community of Bixby.

After passing through the unincorporated community of Pratt, US 218 meets US 14 at a folded diamond interchange. US 218 runs westward concurrently with US 14, while its historic route through downtown Owatonna continues ahead as CR 48. After an interchange with CR 45 (former US 65), US 14/US 218 passes by Kaplan's Woods Park and reaches I-35, where US 218 ends.

Legally, the Minnesota section of US 218 is defined as Route 40 in Minnesota Statutes § 161.114(2).

History
In 1913, work on the road that is now US 218 was begun. At this time it was called the Red Ball Route. It was called this because the original route was marked with poles which had red balls,  in diameter, mounted on each side. In 1920, the Minnesota portion of the route was designated as Constitutional Route 40, as part of the Babcock Amendment that established the Minnesota trunk highway system.

In Iowa, US 218 was extended from its previous southern terminus, at its intersection with U.S. 30 in Benton County, in 1934 when U.S. Highway 161 was split and renamed. The former U.S. 161 had extended from Dubuque, through Cedar Rapids, to Keokuk. After the split, the section of former US 161 from Dubuque to Cedar Rapids extended US 151 south, and the section of US 30 from the former terminus of US 218 to its intersection with the former US 161 in Cedar Rapids, along with the section of former US 161 from Cedar Rapids to Keokuk, extended US 218 south.

In 1965, US 218 was rerouted along bypasses of Austin, Minnesota and Owatonna, Minnesota, the latter following a route that would later become the US 14 bypass of that city as well.

Future
The Iowa Department of Transportation has plans to rebuild the AOTS interchange with I-80 and I-380/US 218/Iowa 27 in Coralville. As the Eastern Iowa region has grown, traffic has increased, and the current arrangement of the interchange with its cloverleaf ramps has been deemed unsafe. The Iowa DOT proposes to rebuilt the interchange as a turbine interchange, which will eliminate weaving. The project is scheduled to begin in 2020.

Major intersections

Related routes

Mount Pleasant business route

U.S. Highway 218 Business (US 218 Bus.) was designated along a former routing of US 218 through Mount Pleasant, the northernmost  are officially known as Iowa 438. The routing was created as a result of construction of the Avenue of the Saints corridor through Iowa. The new Avenue of the Saints corridor took US 218/Iowa 27 and US 34 around the eastern and northern edges of Mount Pleasant. The Iowa 438 section of US 218 Bus. serves as a connector from southbound US 218/Iowa 27 to westbound US 34.

Waverly business route

US 218 Business (US 218 Bus.) in Waverly was designated December 2, 1998, on the old segment of US 218 after it was routed around Waverly. The business route spans . South of Iowa 3, US 218 Bus. is officially known as Iowa 116. US 218 Bus. begins at exit 198 on US 218/Iowa 27 south of Waverly and ends at exit 205 on US 218/Iowa 27.

Charles City business route

US 218 Business (US 218 Bus.) in Charles City was designated along the old alignment of US 218 in 2000 after the construction of the Avenue of the Saints corridor created a bypass around Charles City. Upon its designation, the route was officially known by two Iowa state highways: Iowa 337 and Iowa 162. Iowa 337 was turned over to local jurisdictions in 2001 and Iowa 162 was turned over in 2006 after US 18 was relocated through Charles City.

References

External links

Endpoints of US highway 218

18-2
18-2
18-2
2
Transportation in Lee County, Iowa
Transportation in Henry County, Iowa
Transportation in Washington County, Iowa
Transportation in Johnson County, Iowa
Transportation in Linn County, Iowa
Transportation in Benton County, Iowa
Transportation in Black Hawk County, Iowa
Transportation in Bremer County, Iowa
Transportation in Chickasaw County, Iowa
Transportation in Floyd County, Iowa
Transportation in Mitchell County, Iowa
Transportation in Mower County, Minnesota
Transportation in Dodge County, Minnesota
Transportation in Steele County, Minnesota